Air Batumbuk Solok United Football Club (simply known as Absolute FC) is an Indonesian football club based in Solok Regency, West Sumatra. They currently compete in the Liga 3 and their homeground is Tuanku Tabiang Stadium.

References

External links
Absolute FC Instagram

Football clubs in Indonesia
 Football clubs in West Sumatra
Association football clubs established in 2019
2019 establishments in Indonesia